This is a list of museums in Andalusia. According to the Ministry of Culture, there are 186 museums in Andalusia.

Museums in Andalusia

Province of Almería

Province of Cádiz

Province of Córdoba 

Cordoba Fine Arts Museum

Province of Granada

Province of Huelva

Province of Jaén

Province of Málaga 

List of museums in the province of Málaga

Province of Seville

See also 
 List of museums in Spain
 Andalusia

References

External links 
 2010 Official guide of museums in Andalusia 

 !
Andalusia